The 2015 Catalan motorcycle Grand Prix was the seventh round of the 2015 Grand Prix motorcycle racing season. It was held at the Circuit de Barcelona-Catalunya in Montmeló on 14 June 2015.

In the MotoGP category, Suzuki's Aleix Espargaró took the manufacturer's first pole position since returning to MotoGP, but he crashed out of the race with 5 laps remaining. Jorge Lorenzo took his fourth win in succession, ahead of Valentino Rossi and Dani Pedrosa, who achieved his first podium of the season. Only 16 riders finished the race as amongst others, Marc Márquez, Andrea Dovizioso, Cal Crutchlow, Pol Espargaró, Yonny Hernández and Nicky Hayden retired from the race. Stefan Bradl took his first win in the Open category finishing in eighth place.

Classification

MotoGP

Moto2

Moto3

Championship standings after the race (MotoGP)
Below are the standings for the top five riders and constructors after round seven has concluded.

Riders' Championship standings

Constructors' Championship standings

 Note: Only the top five positions are included for both sets of standings.

References

Catalan
Catalan Motorcycle Grand Prix
motorcycle
Catalan motorcycle Grand Prix
Catalan motorcycle Grand Prix